The Indie Game Challenge is an award competition run in conjunction between the Academy of Interactive Arts & Sciences (AIAS), GameStop and The Guildhall at Southern Methodist University (SMU) to support independent video game development. Started in 2009, the competition highlights ten to twelve independent games, with winning games receiving monetary rewards in addition to the award. The Indie Game Challenge ceremonies are held during the annual D.I.C.E. Summit, during which the finalists are able to demonstrate their games to the press.

Concept
The Indie Game Challenge awards were created by AIAS, Gamestop, and the Guildhall to promote innovation in gaming from independent development. Mike Hogan, senior vice-president of marketing for Gamestop, cited the need for "new, cutting edge game developers who continue to stretch the boundaries and imaginations of gamers" in the industry, and hoped that the awards would "stimulate a new generation of game developers". The competition was designed to offer both monetary and scholarship prizes, valued up to $300,000.

The Challenge accepts games in playable, near-complete versions (including beta software), and for games that have been released, limits such entries to those that have earned less than $100,000 prior to the competition. The Challenge allows entries for games that have already been submitted to other game contests.  Once the judges have selected the finalists, a public voter for "Gamer's Choice" is started among the finalists for a $10,000 prize. The finalists are invited to the D.I.C.E. Summit, giving them exposure to major video game publishers and journalists, a lucrative opportunity for independent developers. After the major awards have been announced, the judges then select finalists to give graduate scholarships to SMU.

The first year for the Challenge drew more than 250 entries to select from.

Finalists and winners

2010
Finalists
 Aaaa! A Reckless Disregard for Gravity - Dejobaan Games
 Altitude - Nimbly Games
 Climb to the Top of the Castle - TwO Bros. Games
 Cogs - Lazy 8 Studios
 Dreamside Maroon - Terraced
 Fieldrunners - Subatomic Studio
 Galactic Arms Race - Evolutionary Complexity Research Group at UCF
 Gear - Team 3
 Miegakure - Marc ten Bosch
 Vessel - Strange Loop Games
 Waker - Poof Productions
 Zeit2 - Brightside Games

Winners
 Grand Prize Award (Professional) - Cogs ($100,000 award)
 Grand Prize Award (Non-professional) - Gear ($100,000 award)
 Technical Achievement - Altitude ($2,500 award)
 Achievement in Art Direction - Cogs ($2,500 award)
 Achievement in Gameplay - Cogs ($2,500 award)
 Gamer's Choice Award - Altitude ($10,000 award)

2011
Finalists
 Confetti Carnival - SpikySnail Games
 Fortix 2 - Nemesys Games
 Hazard: The Journey of Life - Alexander Bruce
 Inertia (video game)|Inertia - Team Hermes
 Limbo - Playdead
 Monaco: What's Yours is Mine - Pocketwatch Games
 Q.U.B.E. - Toxic Games
 Solace - One Man Down
 Spirits - Spaces of Play
 Subsonic - Team Height Advantage
 Symon - ZZZ Games
 Vanessa Saint-Pierre Delacroix & Her Nightmare - Bad Pilcrow

Winners
 Grand Prize Winner (Professional): Limbo ($100,000 prize)
 Grand Prize Winner (Non-professional): Inertia ($100,000 prize)
 Kongregate Award: Symon
 Technical Achievement: Inertia ($2,500 prize)
 Achievement in Art Direction: Limbo ($2,500 prize)
 Achievement in Gameplay: Inertia ($2,500 prize)
 Gamer's Choice Award: Inertia ($10,000 prize)

2012
Finalists
 Atom Zombie Smasher - Blendo Games
 The Bridge - Ty Taylor and Mario Castaneda
 Closure - Eyebrow Interactive
 Demolition Inc. - Zeroscale
 The Dream Machine - Team Dream
 The Fourth Wall - Team Pig Trigger
 Nitronic Rush - Team Nitronic
 Paradox Shift - Paradox Shift
 The Swapper - Facepalm Games
 Symphony - Empty Clip Studios

Winners
 Grand Prize Winner: Closure ($100,000 prize)
 Technical Achievement: Symphony ($2,500 prize)
 Achievement in Gameplay: The Bridge ($2,500 prize)
 Achievement in Art Direction: The Bridge ($2,500 prize)
 GameStop PC Digital Download Award: Symphony
 Gamer's Choice Award: Nitronic Rush ($2,500 prize)

References

External links
 

Video game development
Video game development competitions
Indie video games